Howard Waldemar Winkler (4 March 1891 – 14 November 1970) was a Liberal party member of the House of Commons of Canada. He was born in Morden, Manitoba and became a farmer by career.

Winkler graduated from the University of Manitoba with a Bachelor of Arts in 1912, and a BSA in 1916. He also served in the military as a member of the 11th Canadian Field Ambulance unit in World War I with some duties in France. His father, Valentine Winkler, was a member of the Legislative Assembly of Manitoba who was provincial Minister of Agriculture from 1915 to 1920.

He was first elected to Parliament at the Lisgar riding in the 1935 general election and re-elected there in 1940, 1945 and 1949. Winkler left the House of Commons after completing his fourth and final term of federal office and did not seek re-election in the 1953 election.

Winkler's uncle was former MLA and Legislative Speaker Enoch Winkler.

Winkler died in the United States in 1970 at Mesa, Arizona.

References

External links

1891 births
1970 deaths
Canadian farmers
Canadian military personnel of World War I
Liberal Party of Canada MPs
Members of the House of Commons of Canada from Manitoba
University of Manitoba alumni
People from Morden, Manitoba
Canadian people of German descent